Rogatka may refer to the following places in Poland:
Rogatka, Lublin Voivodeship
Rogatka, Szczecin